Pradip Sarkar is an Indian politician serving as the member of the Assam Legislative Assembly from Abhayapuri South since 2021,defeating AGP's Purnendu Banikya.He is a member of the Indian National Congress.His father, Chandan Sarkar was also MLA and minister in the Government of Assam and his mother,Swapna Rani Sarkar was chairman of Abhayapuri Town Committee.

References 

Living people
Assam politicians
Year of birth missing (living people)
Assam MLAs 2021–2026
People from Bongaigaon district
Indian National Congress politicians from Assam